An open file in chess is a  with no pawns of either color on it.  In the diagram, the e-file is an open file.  An open file can provide a line of attack for a rook or queen. Having rooks or queens on open files or half-open files is considered advantageous, as it allows a player to attack more easily, since a rook or queen can move down the file to penetrate the opponent's position.

Strategic advantage
A common strategic objective for a rook or queen on an open file is to reach its seventh or eighth  (the opponent's second or first rank). Controlling the seventh rank is generally worth at least a pawn, as it threatens all the opponent's yet-unmoved pawns to some degree. Controlling the eighth rank is likely to force the opposing king into a more exposed position and puts pressure on any remaining  pieces, or if the rank is already clear, allows unobstructed movement behind the enemy forces.

Many games are decided based on this strategy. In the game Anand–Ivanchuk, Amber 2001, Anand sacrificed a pawn to open the d-file. White then used the open file to deploy his rooks to the seventh and eighth ranks and win the game, by exploiting the weakness of Black's a-pawn. White's dominance on the d-file allowed him to maneuver his rooks to aggressive posts deep within Black's defense.

See also
 Half-open file

Notes

References

Further reading

Chess terminology
Chess strategy